Dorfchemnitz is a municipality in the district of Mittelsachsen, in Saxony, Germany.

Famous people born in Dorfchemnitz

 Samuel von Pufendorf (1632 – 1694), German jurist and political philosopher
 Frieder Lippmann (born 3 September 1936), German politician
 Michael Grätzel (born 11 May 1944), professor at the École Polytechnique Fédérale de Lausanne

References

Mittelsachsen